The Vise (later known as Saber of London, also known as Mark Saber) is an American detective drama that was broadcast on ABC (1955-1957) and then moved to NBC (1957-1960).  The series is a reboot of the ABC Mystery Theater radio and television series. It was produced by the Danzigers and starred Donald Gray as Mark Saber. It mostly ran during prime time in the late 1950s.

Background  

ABC had originally broadcast a radio series called ABC Mystery Theater alongside a television series of the same name from 1951 to 1954. In the TV series, Mark Saber was portrayed by Tom Conway and his assistant Tim Maloney was portrayed by James Burke. Saber was a British detective working in an American homicide department.

In the meantime in 1954, the Danzigers were developing a mystery anthology series called The Vise. It was hosted by Australian actor Ron Randell and was broadcast on various ITV channels in the UK, as well as syndicated episodes of The Pendulum in the US; The Crooked Path on ITV, and Tension on ITV.

Cast 
Per listing in The Complete Directory to Prime Time Network and Cable TV Shows 1946–Present and Encyclopedia of Earth Television Crime Fighters
 Donald Gray as Mark Saber
 Michael Balfour as Barney O'Keefe (1955–1956), Saber's assistant
 Teresa Thorne as Judy (1958)
 Diana Decker as Stephanie Ames (1956–1957), Saber's secretary and assistant
 Neil McCallum as Pete Paulson (1957–1958), Saber's assistant
 Gordon Tanner as Pete Paulson (1958)
 Robert Arden as Bob Page (1958–1960), Saber's assistant
 Colin Tapley as Inspector Parker (1957–1960)

Production 
In 1955, the Danzigers changed the format of The Vise from an anthology series to a standard format mystery series completely dedicated to the Mark Saber stories. They rebooted the Mark Saber drama and television series that was running on ABC in the US. Saber, portrayed by Donald Gray, was now a one-armed private detective in London and would be solving mysteries occurring in the UK as well as in Paris and the Riviera. Instead of Maloney, Saber had various assistants. Gray himself was also an amputee.

Screenplays were done by Mark Grantham, Brian Clemens, and others. Episodes were formatted for the half-hour time slot. Two episodes were shot every five days.  In an interview with Wheeler Winston Dixon, Clemens said that in the four years he wrote for the show, he only went on set with the Danzigers about eight times. The budgets for the episodes were about 17 thousand pounds for a feature, and shooting took about 8–10 days.

Broadcast 
For the 1955-56 television season, The Vise aired on ABC at 9:30 p.m. EST on Fridays.  It also aired at the same time for the 1956–57 season.

In 1957, the show was moved to NBC and retitled Saber of London, when it aired at 7:30 p.m. EST on Fridays. In the 1957–58 season, it competed against  Leave It to Beaver on CBS and  The Adventures of Rin Tin Tin on ABC. The Vise was also shown as The Vise: Mark Saber on ITV companies in Europe.

In the 1958–1959 season, Saber of London switched to 7 p.m. Sundays, opposite CBS's Lassie. In its last year, 1959–1960, it was moved a half-hour earlier just outside prime time to 6:30 p.m EST on Sundays, just outside prime time. It also continued to run on ITV channels at various times in the UK.  Alternative titles for the series in syndication include Detective's Diary and Uncovered

References

External links
  Mark Saber on Thrilling Detective (wordpress)
 Mark Saber Danziger series at 78rpm.co.uk

Amputees in fiction
American Broadcasting Company original programming
1955 American television series debuts
1960 American television series endings
1950s American drama television series
1950s American crime television series
Television shows set in London
Television series reboots
NBC original programming
Television shows shot at New Elstree Studios